Shepherds Flat is a locality in central Victoria, Australia.

There is no town. The main thoroughfare is the Hepburn-Newstead Road which, despite its name, runs between Hepburn, Victoria and Franklinford, Victoria.

References

External links

Towns in Victoria (Australia)